1961 Preparatory Meeting of the Non-Alignment Countries was held in Cairo, United Arab Republic (today Egypt) from 5 to 12 June 1961 to discuss the goals of a policy of nonalignment ahead of the 1st Summit of the Non-Aligned Movement which will take place in September of the same year in Belgrade, SFR Yugoslavia. The goal of the meeting was to set common criteria for attendance at the Belgrade Conference with Cairo attendees division into two fractions of “inclusives” led by  Nehru’s government of India and  “exclusives” led by the Casablanca Group. Group led by India wanted for future summit to welcome neutral countries in Europe and if feasible multiple Latin American countries and for the event to focus on what was perceived by Indian representatives as grand and overarching issues of global consequence instead of more parochial concerns. Cuban and Guinean representatives were dominant in the “exclusives” group which wanted to focus on the issue of decolonization and criticism of the West Bloc.

See also
 Foreign relations of Egypt
 Egypt and the Non-Aligned Movement
 Third All-African Peoples' Conference

References

Preparatory Meeting
Foreign relations of Egypt
Conferences in Cairo
1961 conferences
1961 in politics
1961 in Egypt